The Second Time Around is a 2016 Canadian romance film directed by Leon Marr and starring Linda Thorson and Stuart Margolin. Two older people find, unpredictably, a sweet and deep connection developing as fellow residents in a retirement community. Opera, family, friends and health challenges are part of their adventure into later life love.

Plot summary

Cast
 Linda Thorson as Katherine Mitchell
 Stuart Margolin as Isaac Shapiro
 Laura de Carteret as Helen, Katherine's daughter
 Louis Del Grande as Charlie
 Jayne Eastwood as Betty
 Alexis Harrison as Sarah, Katherine's granddaughter
 Martha Gibson as Alice
 Don Francks as Murray
 Paul Soles as Marvin
 Richard Waugh as Dr. Norris

Reception
The film has an 82% rating on Rotten Tomatoes.  Brad Wheeler of The Globe and Mail awarded the film three stars out of four.  Bruce DeMara of the Toronto Star awarded it two and a half stars out of four.  Bill Brownstein of the Montreal Gazette gave the film three and a half stars.

Frank Ochieng of Screen Anarchy gave the film a positive review and wrote, "Nevertheless, the main ingredients that allow The Second Time Around to effectively resonate are its two veteran leads in the always radiant Linda Thorson and spunky Stuart Margolin."

Chris Knight of the National Post also gave the film a positive review and wrote, "If you need a break from aliens, superheroes and explosions, you could do worse."

References

External links
 
 
 

English-language Canadian films
Canadian romantic drama films
2016 romance films
2010s Canadian films